Where is a series of magazines for tourists, distributed at hotels, convention centres, regional malls and other tourist areas.

History
The original edition was founded in 1938.

Publishers
Throughout most of the world, the magazine's editions are published by Morris Visitor Publications; it is published in Milan (Italy) by Where Italia Srl, in Rome by Tourist Media Srl, in Canada by St. Joseph Media and in Asia by Asia City Media Group.

Editions

Asia
(all published by Asia City Media Group)

 Where Hong Kong (Hong Kong)
 Where Hong Kong Chinese edition (Hong Kong), aimed at Mainland Chinese tourists; launched in September 2012
 Where Macau (Macau) – launched in December 2003
 Where Singapore (Singapore)
 Where Thailand (Thailand) – launched in December 2011

Australia
(all published by Morris Visitor Publications)

 Where Sydney
 Where Melbourne
 Where Brisbane

Europe
(the majority published by Morris Visitor Publications)

 Where Berlin (Berlin, Germany)
 Where London (London, England)
 Where Milan (Milan, Italy), published by Where Italia srl, an editorial partnership between Morris Visitor Publications and Proedi, Milan (Italy), a leading publisher for the past 30 years in cross-media communication projects.
 Where Moscow (Moscow, Russia)
 Where Naples (Naples, Italy)
 Where Paris (Paris, France)
 Where Rome (Rome, Italy)
 Where St. Petersburg (Saint Petersburg, Russia)
 Where Venice (Venice, Italy), also published by Where Italia srl.

North America
(all published by Morris Visitor Publications in United States, all published by St. Joseph Media in Canada, except as noted)

Canada
(all published by St. Joseph Media, except as noted)

 Where Calgary (Calgary, Alberta)
 Where Canada
 Where Canadian Rockies (Banff, Canmore, Jasper, Kananaskis and Lake Louise, Alberta)
 Where Edmonton (Edmonton, Alberta)
 Where Halifax (Halifax, Nova Scotia) – published by Metro Guide Publishing
 Where Mississauga (Mississauga, Ontario)
 Where Muskoka (Muskoka and Parry Sound, Ontario)
 Where Ottawa (Ottawa, Ontario)
 Where Toronto (Toronto, Ontario)
 Where Vancouver (Vancouver, British Columbia)
 Where Victoria (Victoria, British Columbia)
 Where Whistler (Whistler, British Columbia)
 Where Winnipeg (Winnipeg, Manitoba)

United States
(all published by Morris Visitor Publications)

 Where Atlanta (Atlanta, Georgia)
 Where Baltimore (Baltimore, Maryland)
 Where Charleston (Charleston, South Carolina)
 Where Charlotte (Charlotte, North Carolina)
 Where Chicago (Chicago, Illinois)
 Where Dallas (Dallas, Texas)
 Where Indianapolis (Indianapolis, Indiana)
 Where Las Vegas (Las Vegas, Nevada)
 Where Miami (Miami, Florida)
 Where New Orleans (New Orleans, Louisiana)
 Where New York (New York City, New York)
 Where Orlando (Orlando, Florida)
 Where Philadelphia (Philadelphia, Pennsylvania)
 Where Phoenix (Phoenix, Arizona)
 Where San Francisco (San Francisco, California)
 Where Seattle (Seattle, Washington)
 Where St. Louis (St. Louis, Missouri)
 Where Twin Cities (Minneapolis – Saint Paul, Minnesota)
 Where Washington, D.C. (Washington, D.C.)

See also

List of travel magazines

References

External links
 where.ca, ''Where Canadas official website
 wheretraveler.com, "Official Website for U.S. and European Where titles"
 where-milan.com, Where Milan'''s official website
 where-venice.com, Where Venices official website

Magazines established in 1938
Lifestyle magazines published in the United States
Travel magazines published in Canada
City guides
Communications in Macau
English-language magazines
Magazines published in France
Magazines published in Hong Kong
Magazines published in London
Magazines published in Singapore
Tourism in Canada
Tourism in Hong Kong
Tourism in London
Tourism in Macau
Tourism in Paris
Tourism in Singapore
Tourism in the United States
Tourism magazines
Magazines published in Toronto